Louder Than Words is a 2013 drama film directed by Anthony Fabian and written by Benjamin Chapin. Starring Timothy Hutton, David Duchovny and Hope Davis, the film focuses on a couple John (David Duchovny) and Brenda (Hope Davis) trying to deal with the death of their daughter Maria (Olivia Steele-Falconer). It was based on events that led to the founding of Maria Fareri Children’s Hospital in Valhalla, New York.

Production of the movie was stalled for a week in 2012 due to the aftermath of Hurricane Sandy.

Plot 
After the unexpected death of their daughter, a couple work to build a state of the art children's hospital where families are welcomed into the healing process.

Reception
The film was released on October 11, 2013 at Hamptons International Film Festival and was received with mixed reviews. Ben Kenigsberg of The New York Times criticized the tone, feeling it did not do the actual events justice. Mark Jenkins of The Washington Post was similarly critical of the choices.

References

External links 
 
 
 

2013 films
American drama films
2013 drama films
Films scored by Geoff Zanelli
2010s English-language films
2010s American films